Columbus is a residential district in Rome, Italy, in Balduina, located north of the city centre.

Parks and gardens

Pineto Regional Park is a protected natural area, instituted in 1987. It has the total area of approximately 240 hectares.

Buildings
The Gesù Divino Maestro Church is one of the most important modern churches of Rome. In 2006 it won the "Merit Award" for Liturgical Design del Faith and Form Award.

References

Subdivisions of Rome
Rome Q. XIV Trionfale